Stephanie Burt (born 1971) is a literary critic and poet who is Professor of English at Harvard University. The New York Times has called her "one of the most influential poetry critics of [her] generation". Burt grew up around Washington, D.C. She has published various collections of poetry and a large amount of literary criticism and research. Her work has appeared in The New Yorker, The New York Times Book Review, The London Review of Books, The Times Literary Supplement, The Believer, and The Boston Review.

Literary criticism: new categories of contemporary poetry

Elliptical poetry
Burt received significant attention for coining the term "elliptical poetry" in a 1998 book review of Susan Wheeler's book Smokes in Boston Review magazine: Elliptical poets try to manifest a person—who speaks the poem and reflects the poet—while using all the verbal gizmos developed over the last few decades to undermine the coherence of speaking selves. They are post-avant-gardist, or post-"postmodern": they have read (most of them) Stein's heirs, and the "language writers," and have chosen to do otherwise. Elliptical poems shift drastically between low (or slangy) and high (or naively "poetic") diction. Some are lists of phrases beginning "I am an X, I am a Y." Ellipticism's favorite established poets are Dickinson, Berryman, Ashbery, and/or Auden ... The poets tell almost-stories, or almost-obscured ones. They are sardonic, angered, defensively difficult, or desperate; they want to entertain as thoroughly as, but not to resemble, television. 
Burt also adds that elliptical poets are "good at describing information overload". In addition to calling the subject of her review, Susan Wheeler, an important elliptical poet, she also lists Liam Rector's The Sorrow of Architecture (1984), Lucie Brock-Broido's The Master Letters (1995), Mark Ford's Landlocked (1992), and Mark Levine's debut, Debt (1993) as "some groundbreaking and definitively Elliptical books."

The New Thing
In 2009, she wrote "The New Things", an essay in which she posits a new category of American contemporary poets, which she calls "The New Thing". These poets derive their style from the likes of William Carlos Williams, Robert Creeley, Gertrude Stein and George Oppen: The poets of the New Thing observe scenes and people (not only, but also, themselves) with a self-subordinating concision, so much so that the term "minimalism" comes up in discussions of their work ... The poets of the New Thing eschew sarcasm and tread lightly with ironies, and when they seem hard to pin down, it is because they leave space for interpretations to fit ... The new poetry, the new thing, seeks, as Williams did, well-made, attentive, unornamented things. It is equally at home (as he was) in portraits and still lifes, in epigram and quoted speech; and it is at home (as he was not) in articulating sometimes harsh judgments, and in casting backward looks. The new poets pursue compression, compact description, humility, restricted diction, and—despite their frequent skepticism—fidelity to a material and social world. They follow Williams’s "demand," as the critic Douglas Mao put it, "both that poetry be faithful to the thing represented and that it be a thing in itself." They are so bound up with ideas of durable thinghood that we can name the tendency simply by capitalizing: the New Thing. . . Reference, brevity, self-restraint, attention outside the self, material objects as models, Williams and his heirs as predecessors, classical lyric and epigram as precedents: all these, together, constitute the New Thing.

Poets whom she cites as examples of "The New Thing" include Rae Armantrout, Michael O'Brien, Justin Marks, Elizabeth Treadwell, and Graham Foust.

Writings
In addition to her essays for the Boston Review, Burt has written for The New Yorker, The New York Times Book Review, Poetry Review, Slate, The Times Literary Supplement, the London Review of Books, and the Yale Review.

She has a particular interest in the work of the poet/critic Randall Jarrell, and Burt's book Randall Jarrell and His Age reevaluates Jarrell's importance as a poet. The book won the Warren-Brooks Award in 2002. In explaining her book's aim, Burt wrote, "Many readers know Jarrell as the author of several anthology poems (for example, "The Death of the Ball Turret Gunner"), a charming book or two for children, and a panoply of influential reviews. This book aims to illuminate a Jarrell more ambitious, more complex, and more important than that." In 2005, she also edited Randall Jarrell on W. H. Auden, a collection of Jarrell's critical essays.

In addition to writing about poets and poetry, Burt has published four books of her own poetry, Popular Music (1999), which won the Colorado Prize for Poetry, Parallel Play (2006), Belmont (2013) and Advice From The Lights (2017).

On occasion, she has been known to write for a popular audience on Slate and for The New Yorker, including an article about X-Men: Days of Future Past in the voice of Kitty Pryde.

Career
Burt earned an AB from Harvard University in 1994 and a PhD from Yale University in 2000 before joining the faculty at Macalester College from 2000 to 2007. Since 2007, she has worked at Harvard University, where she became a tenured professor in 2010.

In 2017, she transitioned to female. She has since been active in LGBTQA+ rights and awareness campaigns.

Bibliography

Poetry

Collections

List of poems

Literary criticism
 Randall Jarrell and His Age (Columbia University Press, 2002)
 Randall Jarrell on W.H. Auden (Columbia University Press, 2005)
 The Forms of Youth: Twentieth-Century Poetry and Adolescence (Columbia University Press, 2007)
 Close Calls with Nonsense: Reading New Poetry (Graywolf Press, 2009)
 The Art of the Sonnet.(2010) Harvard University Press ( co-authored with David Mikics) 
 
 From There: Some Thoughts on Poetry & Place. (2016) Ronsdale Press 
 The Poem Is You: 60 Contemporary American Poems and How to Read Them. (2016) Harvard University Press

References

External links

 Burt's personal website
 Burt's Boston Review essay introducing "Elliptical poetry"
 Burt's Boston Review essay on "The New Thing"
 Plunkett, Adam, "The Poetry World's Most Indiscriminate Fanboy", The New Republic, October 26, 2013
 

American literary critics
Women literary critics
The Believer (magazine) people
Harvard University alumni
The New Yorker people
Yale University alumni
Living people
Transgender women
Transgender writers
Transgender academics
Harvard University faculty
Macalester College faculty
1971 births
American women critics